Girl Lost is a 2016 American drama film written and directed by Robin Bain.

Girl Lost was filmed on location in Los Angeles, California and was released by Cinema Epoch on Amazon Prime Video in 2018. The film quickly became the #1 trending movie on Amazon Prime Video in June 2018.  In addition, Girl Lost held the position as the #1 most popular movie on Tubi during the months of June and July 2018.

Beyond the film's domestic release, Girl Lost has been released internationally in the United Kingdom, Germany and Japan.

Plot
Girl Lost explores underage prostitution in the seedy underbelly of Hollywood. The film brings to light the very real tragedy of sex trafficking in the United States.

Girl Lost follows the life of 15-year-old, Shara. After being sexually abused by her mother's boyfriend, Shara runs away with her street hustler boyfriend, Jamie. Jamie and Shara struggle to survive in Los Angeles, but ultimately, they fail. Finding herself homeless and alone, the wayward teen turns to the only option she believes she has... Selling her body and her soul. Shara begins working as a prostitute in a back-alley Russian brothel with other underage girls and her life begins to unravel.

Cast 

 Jessica Taylor Haid as Shara
 Felix Ryan as Jamie
 Robin Bain as Kim
 Emily Cheree Dye as Bridgette
 James Seaman as Louie
 Irena Stemer as Madame Yeva
 Misha Suvorov as Sero
 Evana Alexeeva as Alin
 Daniel Wojack as Stosh

Film development
Girl Lost was partially funded on Kickstarter under the working title Nowhereland. Cinema Epoch, the film's distribution company, changed the name to Girl Lost upon the release of the film in 2018.

Girl Lost: A Hollywood Story
A second Girl Lost film, Girl Lost: A Hollywood Story  written, directed, produced and edited by Robin Bain was released on December 1, 2020, on Amazon Prime Video in the United States.

Critical reception
The film received a 5/5 star rating from reviewer FilmFervor.com in which the article states, "This is just an amazing film. Perfectly executed in every way. Outstanding."

While still in development and raising funds on Kickstarter, Girl Lost, under the working title, Nowhereland, was honored as "Project of the Day" on IndieWire.

Awards

References

External links

Interview with filmmaker Robin Bain on "Film Courage"

2016 films
American independent films
American drama films
Films shot in Los Angeles
Films set in Los Angeles
2010s English-language films
2010s American films